The 2001 Tour de Hongrie was the 28th edition of the Tour de Hongrie cycle race and was held from 8 to 12 August 2001. The race started in Veszprém and finished in Budapest. The race was won by Mikoš Rnjaković.

General classification

References

2001
Tour de Hongrie
Tour de Hongrie